This is a list of streams and rivers in Namibia, arranged geographically by drainage basin.

Flowing into the Atlantic Ocean 
 Hoanib River
 Aap River
 Ganamub River
 Mudorib River
 Ombonde River
 Honib River
 Otjovasandu River
 Otjitaimo River
 Tsuchub River
 Hoarusib River
 Huab River
 Aba Huab River
 Klein Omaruru River
 Klip River
 Ongwati River
 Kakatswa River
 Sout River
 Khumib River
 Koigab River
 Gui-Tsawisib River
 Springbok River
 Kuiseb River
 Chausib River
 Gaub River
 Ubib River
 Goagos River
 Gomab River
 Koam River
 Nausgomab River
 Ojab River
 Kunene River
 Messum River
 Omaruru River
 Goab River
 Leeu River
 Okandjou River
 Otjimakuru River
 Spitzkop River
 Orange River
 Fish River
 Konkiep River
 Löwen River
 Molopo River (South Africa, Botswana)
 Nossob River
 Auob River
 Oanob River
 Olifants River
 Skaap River
 Black Nossob River
 Klein Nossob River
 White Nossob River
 Orawab River
 Swakop River
 Gami Kaub River
 Kaan River
 Khan River
 Etiro River
 Slang River
 Omusema River
 Otjiseva River
 Sney River
 Tsaobis River
 Ugab River
 Erundu River
 Goantagab River
 Okomize River
 Ozongombo River
 Uis River
 Uniab River
 Aub River
 Barab River
 Kaikams River
 Kawakab River
 Urenindes River
 Obob River

Flowing into the Indian Ocean 
 Zambezi
 Kwando River (or Linyanti River or Chobe River)

Flowing into endorheic basins

Arasab Pan
 Arasab River

Etosha Pan 
 Akazulu River
 Cuvelai River
 Ekuma River
 Etosha River
 Nipele River
 Okatana River
 Omuramba Ovambo
 Omuthiya River
 Oshigambo River

Koichab Pan 
 Koichab River

Okau Swamp 
 Munutum River

Okavango Delta 
 Eiseb River
 Epukiro River
 Daneib River
 Khaudom River
 Nhoma River
 Okavango River
 Mpungu River
 Omatako Omuramba
 Otjozondjou River

Sossusvlei 
 Tsauchab
 Zebra River

Tsondabvlei 
 Tsondab River
 Diep River
 Koireb River
 Noab River

Unnamed Pans 
 Duwisib River

Evaporating in the desert

Kalahari
 Chapman's River
 Rietfontein River

Namib
 Kaukausib
 Hunkab River
 Nadas River
 Ondusengo River
 Sechomib River
 Tumas River
 Uguchab River

Alphabetic list 

Akazulu River ∘ Arasab River ∘ Auob River

Chapman's River ∘ Cuvelai River

Daneib River ∘ Duwisib River

Eiseb River ∘ Ekuma River ∘ Etosha River ∘ Epukiro River

Fish River

Hoanib River ∘ Hoarisib River ∘ Huab River ∘ Hunkab River

Kaukausib River ∘ Khan River ∘ Khaudom River ∘ Khumib River ∘ Koigab River ∘ Koichab River ∘ Konkiep River ∘ Kuiseb River ∘ Kunene River ∘ Kwando River

Löwen River

Messum River ∘ Mpungu River ∘ Munutum River

Nadas River ∘ Nhoma River ∘ Nipele River ∘ Nossob River

Oanob River ∘ Olifants River ∘ Okatana River ∘ Okavango River ∘ Omaruru River ∘ Omatako Omuramba ∘ Omuramba Ovambo ∘ Omuthiya River ∘ Ondusengo River ∘ Orange River ∘ Orawab River ∘ Oshigambo River ∘ Otjozondjou River

Rietfontein River

Sechomib River ∘ Skaap River ∘ Swakop River

Tsauchab River ∘ Tsondab River ∘ Tumas River

Ugab River ∘ Uguchab River ∘ Uniab River

Zambezi

References

Namibia
Rivers